Kunstforum Baden-Badener Versicherung was an art museum in Saarland, Germany from 1992 to 2016.

External links
Official site

Museums in Saarland
Art museums and galleries in Germany